"TKN" (phonetic abbreviation for "Tekken", a 1994 Japanese fight videogame) is a song performed by Spanish singer-songwriter Rosalía and American rapper and singer Travis Scott. Produced by Rosalía, El Guincho, Sky Rompiendo el Bajo, Tainy and Teo Halm, the song was released on May 28, 2020, through Columbia Records. This marks the second collaboration between the performers, the first one being a remix of Scott's "Highest in the Room". The song reached number one in Spain and Colombia, as well as the top ten in Panama, Costa Rica, Portugal, Switzerland, Belgium, Czech Republic, Argentina and New Zealand. Its music video, directed by Canada, was awarded a Latin Grammy for Best Short Form Music Video and a Premio Lo Nuestro for Video of the Year, among others.

Background
In March 2020, during the international lockdown caused by the COVID-19 pandemic, Rosalía appeared on several radio stations and TV shows to promote her new work, a promotional single titled "Dolerme"; she told El Hormiguero that she had released that track in substitution of a "very aggressive track that featured an American artist which was meant to be released that month but that didn't match the whole situation". In April, Rosalía told Zane Lowe on Beats 1 that the collaborator was Travis Scott, who she personally met through Kylie Jenner in the summer of 2019 and then performed at his Astroworld Festival in Houston in November. She stated that "this song is so aggressive, it has like an energy that I think that is so specific for a certain moment. It is really meant to be played in a club".

On May 22, Rosalía shared a 30-second clip on Instagram stories of her in Miami listening to the song on her phone. The clip showed Scott rapping in Spanish for the first time in his career. Three days later, she officially announced the name of the track as well as its respective cover art. On May 27, Rosalía changed the picture of her selfmade Spotify playlist 'La Rosalía' with one that was taken during the filming of the music video. Later, she shared a preview of the song and the music video on social media.

Composition and lyrics
"TKN" was first written by Rosalía in a homemade studio in Hollywood Hills in January 2019 as a solo project. However, the track was re-recorded at the Conway Recording Studios in Los Angeles in February and turned into a duet. The track is two minutes and nine seconds long, one of the shortest songs in both artists' repertoire. The track was written by DJ Nelson, Pablo Díaz-Reixa and the performers themselves and produced mainly by Rosalía and El Guincho, with help by Sky Rompiendo el Bajo, Tainy and Teo Halm. In July 2021, it was revealed that Puerto Rican singer Lunay was scheduled to collaborate on the track before Scott jumped on it.

The track is a conceptual song centered around a gangster family formed by the two performers, Rosalía and Travis Scott. The song sees Scott being murdered in a gang war between drug networks, while Rosalía becomes a widow who still dresses in black in order to express mourning. According to XXLs Trent Fitzgerald "The gang could either be Italian or Brazilian due to the uncountable Sicilian references, from 'capo' to 'omertà' and for the use of the word 'brazuca', which references someone originary from Brazil". Rosalía sings about how she cannot trust anyone anymore, while Scott's lyrics contains "a conversation with and about the woman of his life, his wife, and how she had nothing to do with this business, that he assumes all the responsibility". Rosalía, the mother and wife, constantly talks about not breaking the 'omertà' a.k.a. the Sicilian law of silence, which forbids talking about any criminal act or crime. The track also references Argentinian film director Gaspar Noé, whose films usually are about drugs, gangs, crime and sects; and a woman dressed in black named "Kika" which references the role played by Verónica Forqué on the 1993 Pedro Almodóvar film Kika.

On release day, Rosalía told Spotify's "Baila Reggaeton" that she got inspired by the "squads" and "clans" some artists have. She stated that the song is based in the most pure and classical reggaeton. Production took a lot of time to develop and perfect, almost a year.

Critical reception 
Sheldon Pearce wrote for Pitchfork: "In 'TKN' they sing in unison, meet on neutral ground, and disavow all potential interlopers. It's a vibrant cross-cultural exchange that proves that relying on new friends can be constructive". Vulture's Justin Curto stated that: "The world is changing all around us, but some things remain constant, among them Rosalía's ability to release a total club banger every few months". Music portal Vinilo Negro wrote: "'TKN' brings back the best Rosalía in just 2 minutes, with an impeccable Travis Scott".

Commercial performance 
"TKN" debuted at the eighth position on the Spotify Global Chart with 3.4 million streams in over a day, marking the second time Rosalía enters the chart. The track became a top ten iTunes hit in Spain and Latin America while the music video became the most trendy in many European and American countries, including the United States. For over two consecutive weeks, the track received an average of two million daily streams on Spotify. Due to this release, Rosalía went from ten million monthly listeners on the platform to over 21 million, reaching 20 million again since September 2019, becoming one of the 100 most listened singers on the streaming platform for the first time ever.

The song peaked on the Billboard Hot 100 at number 66, becoming her first chart entry and the first time a Spanish female solo act does since Rocío Jurado in 1985. It also reached the second position on the US Hot Latin Song chart. “TKN" became a top 10 hit in Switzerland, New Zealand and Portugal, while reaching the top position in Spain, marking Rosalía's sixth number one single in her home country and Scott's first one there. On June 27 the track reached 100 million combined streams, combining YouTube and Spotify. Later, on July 18, the track reached 100 million streams exclusively on Spotify.

In late June the song became very popular on TikTok thanks to a series of dance videos posted by media personalities Charli D'Amelio and Maddie Ziegler among others. The viral choreography, marked by movements of the waist and hips, was created by Retroconverse. Starting with D'Amelio's post on June 27, the audio became trending on the app. The audio went from 40,000 uses to 500,000 in a single week. Spotify streams in this period of time went from 1,5 million daily streams to over 2 million. This trend helped the track reach the top spots in the ITunes charts in Portugal and Czech Republic despite being released for over a month. The audio reached a million uses on TikTok on July 12.

Despite being released four month before, "TKN" still managed to enter the new Billboard Global 200 chart and the Global Excl. US, which were launched in September 2020.

Music video
The music video for "TKN" was filmed in Los Angeles between February 15 and 17, 2020. As revealed to Barcelonian radio station RAC 1, the video was produced by Catalan production company CANADA, who also took part in the production of Rosalía's Billboard x Honda 3-episode documentary and in some of her earlier songs like "Malamente" and "Pienso en tu Mirá". During her interview with Zane Lowe on Beats 1 in April, Rosalía confirmed that the music video was already finished. It premiered on YouTube on May 28 and scored a win for Best Short Form Music Video at the 2020 Latin Grammy Awards. It also won the Premio Lo Nuestro for Video of the Year and was nominated for a Los40 Music Award for Best Latin Video.

Synopsis
Directed by Nicolás Méndez and produced by CANADA alongside The Directors Bureau, it shows Rosalía with over thirty kids running through North Hollywood, Pomona and inside a house in South Los Angeles wearing outfits designed by Alexander Wang. These children portray the sons and daughters of Rosalía and Travis Scott, who died in a shooting and whose body was discovered by the police sometime after. Rosalía portrays a widow and a single mother. Paintings on the house's walls reflect the storyline. They show people with guns in their hands, three people holding burning torches and a dead bird, among others. A dead white dove also appears in the video. It falls to the ground and attracts the kids, who poke it with a stick The music video ends with Rosalía hugging one of the children. Mariah Tavares child being held.  The video's choreography was designed by Charm La'Donna.

Remix 
On June 26, 2020, Venezuelan musician Arca played a special DJ set on BBC Radio 1 Dance to celebrate the release of her fourth studio album KiCk i. The musician played multiple tracks off it as well as "KLK", her collaboration with Rosalía and remixed the Spanish singer's track "TKN", which was moderately-well received by the public. The "TKN" remix includes distortionated voices, spaceship sounds and traffic noise effects among others.

Awards and nominations

Personnel 

Credits adapted from Tidal.

 Rosalía Vila – vocals, songwriting, production, arrangement
 Travis Scott – vocals, songwriting, production
 Pablo Díaz-Reixa – production, songwriting, arrangement, recording engineering
 Alejandro Ramírez – composer, production
 DJ Nelson – composer
 Marco Masís – composer, production
 Teo Halm  – production
 José David Acedo Morales – arrangement
 Robin Florent – assistant engineering
 Jeremie Inhaber – assistant engineering
 Scott Desmarais – assistant engineering
 Sean Solymar – assistant engineering
 Michelle Mancini – master engineering
 Mike Dean – mixing engineering
 Chris Galland – mixing engineering
 Manny Marroquin – mixing engineering
 David Rodríguez – recording engineering

Charts

Weekly charts

Year-end charts

Certifications

Release history

References

2020 singles
Columbia Records singles
Epic Records singles
Number-one singles in Spain
Rosalía songs
Travis Scott songs
Song recordings produced by el Guincho
Songs written by Rosalía
Songs written by el Guincho
Songs written by Tainy
Songs written by Travis Scott
Song recordings produced by Tainy
2020 songs
Number-one singles in Colombia
Gangsta rap songs
Reggaeton songs
Trap music songs
Spanglish songs